Honduras National Congress has 128 members (diputados); they serve four-year terms.

Honduras elects on national level a head of state – the president –  and a legislature. The President of Honduras  is elected for a four-year term by the people by a simple majority of valid votes (nulls and blanks excluded). The unicameral National Congress (Congreso Nacional) has 128 members (diputados), elected for four-year term by proportional representation to represent the country's various departments. Honduras' presidential elections are held on the last Sunday of November of the election year.

Honduras has a multi-party system, but used to have a two-party system, which means that there were two dominant political parties: the  Liberal Party of Honduras (PLH) and the National Party of Honduras (PNH). Ahead of the 2013 general election various new parties emerged as contenders for power and influence.

Primary elections of Honduras 

Primary elections in Honduras, are mechanisms by means of which the political parties of the country choose their presidential candidates, held during the third year in office of the current government. These primary elections are not compulsory, nor paid for by the state The electoral high court of Honduras regulates this process, and the National Register of the People is an organism of support that gives legitimacy to the electoral process.

General elections of Honduras 
General elections in Honduras are held during the fourth year in office of the government, some months before finalising his mandate and a year after the primary elections that chose the presidential candidates of each political party. In them they renewed the headlines of the charges of popular election of the Republic of Honduras.

Schedule

Election

Inauguration

Recent elections

2005 Presidential election

2009 Presidential and parliamentary elections
 Disputed in the wake of the 2009 Honduran constitutional crisis

2013 Presidential and parliamentary elections

2017 Presidential and parliamentary elections

See also
 Politics of Honduras
 Honduras
 Primary elections in Honduras
 Legal history in Honduras
 Government of Honduras
 Supreme Court of Honduras
 National Congress of Honduras
 Constitution of Honduras
 Public Prosecutor's Office (Honduras)
 President of Honduras

External links
Adam Carr's Election Archive for Honduras
Panorama Presidencial on NuevaMayoria.com (in Spanish)